Carl Emanuel Conrad (20 March 1810 - 12 July 1873), was an architectural painter.

He instructed first in Berlin and afterwards at the Kunstakademie Düsseldorf, which he attended from 1835 till 1839. Both in this institution and at the Realschule he gave instruction in perspective to young artists, and received the title of professor, the Order of the Red Eagle, and a medal from the Pope. He painted buildings of the Middle Ages, with landscape surroundings, such as 'The Church of St. Quirinus in Neuss', 'The Cloister of St. Severinus in Cologne' (1837), 'The Cathedral of Mayence' (1841), 'Custom House in London' (1852) and 'Views of Cologne Cathedral'. He also executed some excellent aquatints, such as 'Pius IX. in his Cabinet' and 'An Assemblage at Sigmaringen in the Olden Time' (1872).

He died at Cologne in 1873.

See also
 List of German painters

References

External links

1810 births
1873 deaths
Artists from Berlin
19th-century German painters
German male painters
Kunstakademie Düsseldorf alumni
19th-century German male artists